The 2002 Notre Dame Fighting Irish baseball team represented the University of Notre Dame in the 2002 NCAA Division I baseball season. The Fighting Irish played their home games at Frank Eck Stadium. The team was coached by Paul Mainieri in his 8th year as head coach at Notre Dame.

The Fighting Irish won the South Bend Regional and the Tallahassee Super Regional to advance to the College World Series, where they were defeated by the Stanford Cardinal.

Roster

Schedule

|-
! style="" | Regular Season
|-

|-
! bgcolor="#DDDDFF" width="3%" | #
! bgcolor="#DDDDFF" width="7%" | Date
! bgcolor="#DDDDFF" width="14%" | Opponent
! bgcolor="#DDDDFF" width="25%" | Site/Stadium
! bgcolor="#DDDDFF" width="5%" | Score
! bgcolor="#DDDDFF" width="5%" | Overall Record
! bgcolor="#DDDDFF" width="5%" | Big East Record
|- align="center" bgcolor="#ccffcc"
| 1 || February 22 || vs Missouri || Maestri Field at Privateer Park • New Orleans, Louisiana || 7–6 || 1–0 || –
|- align="center" bgcolor="#ffcccc"
| 2 || February 23 || at  || Maestri Field at Privateer Park • New Orleans, Louisiana || 7–8 || 1–1 || –
|- align="center" bgcolor="#ffcccc"
| 3 || February 24 || vs  || Maestri Field at Privateer Park • New Orleans, Louisiana || 2–6 || 1–2 || –
|-

|-
! bgcolor="#DDDDFF" width="3%" | #
! bgcolor="#DDDDFF" width="7%" | Date
! bgcolor="#DDDDFF" width="14%" | Opponent
! bgcolor="#DDDDFF" width="25%" | Site/Stadium
! bgcolor="#DDDDFF" width="5%" | Score
! bgcolor="#DDDDFF" width="5%" | Overall Record
! bgcolor="#DDDDFF" width="5%" | Big East Record
|- align="center" bgcolor="#ccffcc"
| 4 || March 1 || vs  || Homestead Sports Complex • Homestead, Florida || 6–0 || 2–2 || –
|- align="center" bgcolor="#ccffcc"
| 5 || March 2 || vs  || Homestead Sports Complex • Homestead, Florida || 6–4 || 3–2 || –
|- align="center" bgcolor="#ffcccc"
| 6 || March 2 || vs  || Homestead Sports Complex • Homestead, Florida || 4–13 || 3–3 || –
|- align="center" bgcolor="#ccffcc"
| 7 || March 3 || vs  || Homestead Sports Complex • Homestead, Florida || 4–1 || 4–3 || –
|- align="center" bgcolor="#ffcccc"
| 8 || March 8 || vs  || Dell Diamond • Round Rock, Texas || 3–7 || 4–4 || –
|- align="center" bgcolor="#ccffcc"
| 9 || March 9 || vs  || Dell Diamond • Round Rock, Texas || 15–8 || 5–4 || –
|- align="center" bgcolor="#ffcccc"
| 10 || March 10 || vs  || Dell Diamond • Round Rock, Texas || 5–6 || 5–5 || –
|- align="center" bgcolor="#ffcccc"
| 11 || March 11 || vs  || Dell Diamond • Round Rock, Texas || 6–8 || 5–6 || –
|- align="center" bgcolor="#ccffcc"
| 12 || March 13 || vs Creighton || Nelson W. Wolff Municipal Stadium • San Antonio, Texas || 6–2 || 6–6 || –
|- align="center" bgcolor="#ccffcc"
| 13 || March 14 || vs Southern Illinois || Nelson W. Wolff Municipal Stadium • San Antonio, Texas || 5–3 || 7–6 || –
|- align="center" bgcolor="#ccffcc"
| 14 || March 15 || vs  || Nelson W. Wolff Municipal Stadium • San Antonio, Texas || 7–5 || 8–6 || –
|- align="center" bgcolor="#ccffcc"
| 15 || March 16 || vs Southern Illinois || Nelson W. Wolff Municipal Stadium • San Antonio, Texas || 3–2 || 9–6 || –
|- align="center" bgcolor="#ffcccc"
| 16 || March 23 || at Connecticut || J. O. Christian Field • Storrs, Connecticut || 3–4 || 9–7 || 0–1
|- align="center" bgcolor="#ffcccc"
| 17 || March 23 || at Connecticut || J. O. Christian Field • Storrs, Connecticut || 8–9 || 9–8 || 0–2
|- align="center" bgcolor="#ffcccc"
| 18 || March 24 || at Connecticut || J. O. Christian Field • Storrs, Connecticut || 6–13 || 9–9 || 0–3
|- align="center" bgcolor="#ffcccc"
| 19 || March 28 || at  || Hawley Field • Morgantown, West Virginia || 2–4 || 9–10 || 0–4
|- align="center" bgcolor="#ccffcc"
| 20 || March 28 || at West Virginia || Hawley Field • Morgantown, West Virginia || 10–6 || 10–10 || 1–4
|- align="center" bgcolor="#ccffcc"
| 21 || March 30 || at  || Shirley Povich Field • Bethesda, Maryland || 10–6 || 11–10 || 2–4
|- align="center" bgcolor="#ccffcc"
| 22 || March 30 || at Georgetown || Shirley Povich Field • Bethesda, Maryland || 12–3 || 12–10 || 3–4
|-

|-
! bgcolor="#DDDDFF" width="3%" | #
! bgcolor="#DDDDFF" width="7%" | Date
! bgcolor="#DDDDFF" width="14%" | Opponent
! bgcolor="#DDDDFF" width="25%" | Site/Stadium
! bgcolor="#DDDDFF" width="5%" | Score
! bgcolor="#DDDDFF" width="5%" | Overall Record
! bgcolor="#DDDDFF" width="5%" | Big East Record
|- align="center" bgcolor="#ccffcc"
| 23 || April 1 ||  || Frank Eck Stadium • Notre Dame, Indiana || 1–0 || 13–10 || 3–4
|- align="center" bgcolor="#ccffcc"
| 24 || April 3 ||  || Frank Eck Stadium • Notre Dame, Indiana || 16–0 || 14–10 || 3–4
|- align="center" bgcolor="#ccffcc"
| 25 || April 3 || Valparasio || Frank Eck Stadium • Notre Dame, Indiana || 12–1 || 15–10 || 3–4
|- align="center" bgcolor="#ccffcc"
| 26 || April 6 ||  || Frank Eck Stadium • Notre Dame, Indiana || 4–1 || 16–10 || 4–4
|- align="center" bgcolor="#ffcccc"
| 27 || April 6 || St. John's || Frank Eck Stadium • Notre Dame, Indiana || 3–4 || 16–11 || 4–5
|- align="center" bgcolor="#ccffcc"
| 28 || April 7 || St. John's || Frank Eck Stadium • Notre Dame, Indiana || 5–2 || 17–11 || 5–5
|- align="center" bgcolor="#ccffcc"
| 29 || April 9 ||  || Frank Eck Stadium • Notre Dame, Indiana || 5–4 || 18–11 || 5–5
|- align="center" bgcolor="#ffcccc"
| 30 || April 11 ||  || Frank Eck Stadium • Notre Dame, Indiana || 5–7 || 18–12 || 5–6
|- align="center" bgcolor="#ccffcc"
| 31 || April 11 || Pittsburgh || Frank Eck Stadium • Notre Dame, Indiana || 12–2 || 19–12 || 6–6
|- align="center" bgcolor="#ccffcc"
| 32 || April 12 ||  || Frank Eck Stadium • Notre Dame, Indiana || 2–1 || 20–12 || 7–6
|- align="center" bgcolor="#ccffcc"
| 33 || April 12 || Virginia Tech || Frank Eck Stadium • Notre Dame, Indiana || 4–2 || 21–12 || 8–6
|- align="center" bgcolor="#ccffcc"
| 34 || April 15 ||  || Frank Eck Stadium • Notre Dame, Indiana || 10–9 || 22–12 || 7–6
|- align="center" bgcolor="#ccffcc"
| 35 || April 16 ||  || Frank Eck Stadium • Notre Dame, Indiana || 10–1 || 23–12 || 7–6
|- align="center" bgcolor="#ccffcc"
| 36 || April 17 ||  || Frank Eck Stadium • Notre Dame, Indiana || 15–4 || 24–12 || 8–6
|- align="center" bgcolor="#ccffcc"
| 37 || April 20 || at  || Owen T. Carroll Field • South Orange, New Jersey || 9–4 || 25–12 || 9–6
|- align="center" bgcolor="#ccffcc"
| 38 || April 21 || at Seton Hall || Owen T. Carroll Field • South Orange, New Jersey || 4–2 || 26–12 || 10–6
|- align="center" bgcolor="#ccffcc"
| 39 || April 21 || at Seton Hall || Owen T. Carroll Field • South Orange, New Jersey || 6–1 || 27–12 || 11–6
|- align="center" bgcolor="#ccffcc"
| 40 || April 23 ||  || Frank Eck Stadium • Notre Dame, Indiana || 9–8 || 28–12 || 11–6
|- align="center" bgcolor="#ccffcc"
| 41 || April 24 ||  || Frank Eck Stadium • Notre Dame, Indiana || 3–2 || 29–12 || 11–6
|- align="center" bgcolor="#ccffcc"
| 42 || April 26 ||  || Frank Eck Stadium • Notre Dame, Indiana || 11–5 || 30–12 || 11–6
|- align="center" bgcolor="#ccffcc"
| 43 || April 30 || vs  || Fifth Third Ballpark • Grand Rapids, Michigan || 7–4 || 31–12 || 11–6
|-

|-
! bgcolor="#DDDDFF" width="3%" | #
! bgcolor="#DDDDFF" width="7%" | Date
! bgcolor="#DDDDFF" width="14%" | Opponent
! bgcolor="#DDDDFF" width="25%" | Site/Stadium
! bgcolor="#DDDDFF" width="5%" | Score
! bgcolor="#DDDDFF" width="5%" | Overall Record
! bgcolor="#DDDDFF" width="5%" | Big East Record
|- align="center" bgcolor="#ccffcc"
| 44 || May 1 ||  || Frank Eck Stadium • Notre Dame, Indiana || 11–5 || 32–12 || 11–6
|- align="center" bgcolor="#ccffcc"
| 45 || May 4 ||  || Frank Eck Stadium • Notre Dame, Indiana || 6–5 || 33–12 || 12–6
|- align="center" bgcolor="#ccffcc"
| 46 || May 4 || Rutgers || Frank Eck Stadium • Notre Dame, Indiana || 7–2 || 34–12 || 13–6
|- align="center" bgcolor="#ffcccc"
| 47 || May 5 || Rutgers || Frank Eck Stadium • Notre Dame, Indiana || 0–11 || 34–13 || 13–7
|- align="center" bgcolor="#ffcccc"
| 48 || May 11 || at  || Richie Ashburn Field • Philadelphia, Pennsylvania || 7–8 || 34–14 || 13–8
|- align="center" bgcolor="#ccffcc"
| 49 || May 12 || at Villanova || Richie Ashburn Field • Philadelphia, Pennsylvania || 8–1 || 35–14 || 14–8
|- align="center" bgcolor="#ccffcc"
| 50 || May 12 || at Villanova || Richie Ashburn Field • Philadelphia, Pennsylvania || 9–5 || 36–14 || 15–8
|- align="center" bgcolor="#ccffcc"
| 51 || May 15 ||  || Frank Eck Stadium • Notre Dame, Indiana || 10–3 || 37–14 || 15–8
|- align="center" bgcolor="#ccffcc"
| 52 || May 15 ||  || Frank Eck Stadium • Notre Dame, Indiana || 23–1 || 38–14 || 15–8
|- align="center" bgcolor="#ccffcc"
| 53 || May 17 ||  || Frank Eck Stadium • Notre Dame, Indiana || 8–2 || 39–14 || 16–8
|- align="center" bgcolor="#ccffcc"
| 54 || May 18 || Boston College || Frank Eck Stadium • Notre Dame, Indiana || 10–6 || 40–14 || 17–8
|- align="center" bgcolor="#ccffcc"
| 55 || May 18 || Boston College || Frank Eck Stadium • Notre Dame, Indiana || 5–2 || 41–14 || 18–8
|-

|-
! style="" | Postseason
|-

|-
! bgcolor="#DDDDFF" width="3%" | #
! bgcolor="#DDDDFF" width="7%" | Date
! bgcolor="#DDDDFF" width="14%" | Opponent
! bgcolor="#DDDDFF" width="25%" | Site/Stadium
! bgcolor="#DDDDFF" width="5%" | Score
! bgcolor="#DDDDFF" width="5%" | Overall Record
! bgcolor="#DDDDFF" width="5%" | Big East Record
|- align="center" bgcolor="#ccffcc"
| 56 || May 23 || vs Rutgers || Commerce Bank Ballpark • Bridgewater, New Jersey || 8–3 || 42–14 || 18–8
|- align="center" bgcolor="#ccffcc"
| 57 || May 24 || vs Virginia Tech || Commerce Bank Ballpark • Bridgewater, New Jersey || 8–4 || 43–14 || 18–8
|- align="center" bgcolor="#ffcccc"
| 58 || May 25 || vs Rutgers || Commerce Bank Ballpark • Bridgewater, New Jersey || 3–4 || 43–15 || 18–8
|- align="center" bgcolor="#ccffcc"
| 59 || May 23 || vs Rutgers || Commerce Bank Ballpark • Bridgewater, New Jersey || 3–2 || 44–15 || 18–8
|-

|-
! bgcolor="#DDDDFF" width="3%" | #
! bgcolor="#DDDDFF" width="7%" | Date
! bgcolor="#DDDDFF" width="14%" | Opponent
! bgcolor="#DDDDFF" width="25%" | Site/Stadium
! bgcolor="#DDDDFF" width="5%" | Score
! bgcolor="#DDDDFF" width="5%" | Overall Record
! bgcolor="#DDDDFF" width="5%" | Big East Record
|- align="center" bgcolor="#ccffcc"
| 60 || May 31 ||  || Frank Eck Stadium • Notre Dame, Indiana || 8–6 || 45–15 || 18–8
|- align="center" bgcolor="#ccffcc"
| 61 || June 1 ||  || Frank Eck Stadium • Notre Dame, Indiana || 25–1 || 46–15 || 18–8
|- align="center" bgcolor="#ccffcc"
| 62 || June 2 || Ohio State || Frank Eck Stadium • Notre Dame, Indiana || 9–6 || 47–15 || 18–8
|-

|-
! bgcolor="#DDDDFF" width="3%" | #
! bgcolor="#DDDDFF" width="7%" | Date
! bgcolor="#DDDDFF" width="14%" | Opponent
! bgcolor="#DDDDFF" width="25%" | Site/Stadium
! bgcolor="#DDDDFF" width="5%" | Score
! bgcolor="#DDDDFF" width="5%" | Overall Record
! bgcolor="#DDDDFF" width="5%" | Big East Record
|- align="center" bgcolor="#ccffcc"
| 63 || June 7 || at  || Dick Howser Stadium • Tallahassee, Florida || 10–4 || 48–15 || 18–8
|- align="center" bgcolor="#ffcccc"
| 64 || June 9 || at Florida State || Dick Howser Stadium • Tallahassee, Florida|| 5–12 || 48–16 || 18–8
|- align="center" bgcolor="#ccffcc"
| 65 || June 10 || at Florida State || Dick Howser Stadium • Tallahassee, Florida|| 3–1 || 49–16 || 18–8
|-

|-
! bgcolor="#DDDDFF" width="3%" | #
! bgcolor="#DDDDFF" width="7%" | Date
! bgcolor="#DDDDFF" width="14%" | Opponent
! bgcolor="#DDDDFF" width="25%" | Site/Stadium
! bgcolor="#DDDDFF" width="5%" | Score
! bgcolor="#DDDDFF" width="5%" | Overall Record
! bgcolor="#DDDDFF" width="5%" | Big East Record
|- align="center" bgcolor="#ffcccc"
| 66 || June 15 || vs Stanford || Johnny Rosenblatt Stadium • Omaha, Nebraska || 3–4 || 49–17 || 18–8
|- align="center" bgcolor="#ccffcc"
| 67 || June 17 || vs  || Johnny Rosenblatt Stadium • Omaha, Nebraska || 5–3 || 50–17 || 18–8
|- align="center" bgcolor="#ffcccc"
| 68 || June 18 || vs Stanford || Johnny Rosenblatt Stadium • Omaha, Nebraska || 3–5 || 50–18 || 18–8
|-

|-
|

Awards and honors 
Matt Bok
Third Team All-Big East Conference

Andrew Bushey
Third Team All-Big East Conference

Grant Johnson
First Freshman All-American Collegiate Baseball Newspaper
Second Freshman Team All-American Baseball America

Paul O'Toole
Second Team All-Big East Conference

Steve Sollmann
Second Team All-Big East Conference

Steve Stanley
First Team All-American American Baseball Coaches Association
First Team All-American Baseball America
First Team All-American National Collegiate Baseball Writers Association
First Team All-American Collegiate Baseball Newspaper
First Team All-American USA Today
Big East Conference Player of the Year
Big East Conference Tournament MVP
First Team All-Big East Conference
College World Series All-Tournament Team

Brian Stavisky
Second Team All-Big East Conference

References

Notre Dame Fighting Irish baseball seasons
Notre Dame Fighting Irish baseball
College World Series seasons
Notre Dame
Big East Conference baseball champion seasons